Asiafroneta is a small genus of southeast Asian sheet weavers. It was first described by A. V. Tanasevitch in 2020, and it has only been found in Malaysia.  it contains only two species: A. atrata and A. pallida.

See also
 List of Linyphiidae species (A–H)

References

Linyphiidae genera
Arthropods of Borneo